Twinnie-Lee Moore (born 14 May 1987), known professionally as Twinnie, is an English pop-country artist, actress, and traveller. In 2021 she founded the global music collective I KNOW A WOMAN whose primary mission is to standardise mental health therapy across the music industry.

Career

Theatre
In 2009, Twinnie was cast as Velma Kelly in the 2009/10 touring version of the Kander and Ebb West End musical Chicago. She then appeared in A Chorus Line, in May 2010 at the Lowry in Manchester.

She was then cast as Jazmin in Flashdance The Musical for its Shaftesbury Theatre production opening in October 2010. Moore played one of three friends who dance in a club, who together "sing practically the whole show".

Twinnie also went on to star in the West End premiere of Rock of Ages in the all-star ensemble and played the lead roles of Sherrie and Justice on many occasions. The show opened on 31 August 2011 at the Shaftesbury Theatre; Moore left the production at a cast change in September 2012.

Film
Twinnie starred as Monica in the drama The Wife, alongside Glenn Close, Max Irons and Christian Slater.

In 2014, Moore was cast as the part of Crazy Mary in the movie Ironclad: Battle for Blood.

Television
Twinnie played Nikki Allcott in Doctors which aired on BBC One on 29 July 2013.

In August 2014, it was announced that Twinnie would be joining the cast of Hollyoaks as Porsche McQueen. She made her first appearance on 4 November 2014. The character highlighted the issues of sexual abuse in children, whilst her other storylines included a failed marriage when her husband had various affairs. Moore left her role in October 2015, with her exit scenes airing on 24 December 2015. Moore was nominated for the British Soap Award for Best Newcomer and an Inside Soap Award in 2015 for her powerful portrayal.

Music
Having been singing and writing music since she was a child, Twinnie self released her debut self-titled EP in 2016 before dropping the Better When I'm Drunk EP via BMG 2 years later. Hit singles followed before she made mainstream waves with her standout debut studio album Hollywood Gypsy in 2020 - a sold-out headline tour of the UK followed in support of the record alongside performances at acclaimed music festivals including CMA Fest, C2C Festival, Bonnaroo, and more. In 2022, Twinnie released her EP Welcome to the Club alongside a short film that narrated the mental health journey of the project.

Discography

Albums

Extended plays

References

English women singer-songwriters
21st-century English actresses
English country musicians
English pop musicians
Actresses from York
Musicians from York
1987 births
Living people